The 2001 season in the Latvian Higher League, named Virslīga, was the eleventh domestic competition since the Baltic nation gained independence from the Soviet Union on 6 September 1991. Eight teams competed in this edition, with Skonto FC claiming the title.

Final table

Match table

Top scorers

Awards

Skonto FC 2001

References

External Links
RSSSF
Skonto FC 2001

Latvian Higher League seasons
1
Latvia
Latvia